is a district located in Hidaka Subprefecture, Hokkaido, Japan.

As of 2004, the district has an estimated population of 21,190 and a density of 12.21 persons per km2. The total area is 1,735.83 km2.

Towns and villages 
Biratori  (town office)
Hidaka  (town office)

Merger 
On March 1, 2006, the town of Monbetsu merged into the expanded town of Hidaka.

External links
 (average of town offices)

Districts in Hokkaido